Ecuador TV is the public service channel of Ecuador established in October 2007 thanks to a provision of non-reimbursable funds of $5 million of the Economic and Social Development Bank of Venezuela (BANDES by its Spanish acronym).

The channel was established at the same time as the installation of the Ecuadorian Constituent Assembly so that the sessions could be transmitted live to all the country.

Programming
The channel transmits content by independent national and international producers and documentaries and news programs from several international producing properties such as Discovery, TVE, BBC, Deutsche Welle, Voice of America, ViVe and teleSUR.

The channel operates as a public service company and broadcasts news and opinion content from several countries, including the United States. The Venezuelan government described its monetary contribution to the creation of the channel as "a caring and selfless contribution of Venezuela as part of the policy of international cooperation in the region that drives the government of President Hugo Chávez".

See also
 Public News Agency of Ecuador and South America

References

External links

Television channels in Ecuador
Publicly funded broadcasters
Television channels and stations established in 2007
Spanish-language television stations
2007 establishments in Ecuador
State media